is a train station on the JR West Onoda Line in San'yō-Onoda, Yamaguchi Prefecture, Japan. It is the terminus station of the Motoyama branch.

Station layout
The station consists of one side platform serving one track. There is no station building, but there is a small shelter near the platform. The station is unattended.

History
The station opened on 21 January, 1937.

References

External links

  

Railway stations in Yamaguchi Prefecture